Lloyd Johnson was an American bobsledder who competed in the early 1950s. He won a gold medal in the four-man event at the 1953 FIBT World Championships in Garmisch-Partenkirchen. Johnson's sled had a fifth place finish at the 1954 championships in Cortina d'Ampezzo. A year later at the 1955 championships in St. Moritz, he competed with a broken collar bone and was thrown off the course at Sunny Corner.

Johnson was a native of Rapid City, South Dakota and graduated from the University of Wisconsin–Madison in 1943.

References

Bobsleigh four-man world championship medalists since 1930
TIME magazine February 7, 1955 article featuring Johnson
TIME magazine February 9, 1953 article featuring Johnson

Year of birth missing
Possibly living people
People from Rapid City, South Dakota
University of Wisconsin–Madison alumni
American male bobsledders